Acronicta is a genus of noctuid moths containing about 150 species distributed mainly in the temperate Holarctic, with some in adjacent subtropical regions. The genus was erected by Carl Linnaeus in his 1758 10th edition of Systema Naturae. Caterpillars of most Acronicta species are unmistakable, with brightly colored hairy spikes, and often feed quite visibly on common foliate trees. The hairy spikes may contain poison, which cause itchy, painful, swollen rash in humans on contact. The larva of the smeared dagger moth (A. oblinita) is unusually hairy even for this genus. Acronicta species are generally known as dagger moths, as most have one or more black dagger-shaped markings on their forewing uppersides. But some species have a conspicuous dark ring marking instead.

Description
Its eyes are naked and without eyelashes. The proboscis is fully developed. Antennae are simple in both sexes. Thorax and abdomen tuftless. Abdomen with long coarse hair on the dorsal part of proximal segments. Legs spineless. Forewings with non-crenulate cilia. Inner margin slightly lobed towards base.

Species
The following species are classified in the genus.
 Acronicta aceris Linnaeus, 1758 – sycamore
 Acronicta adaucta Warren, 1909
 Acronicta afflicta Grote, 1864 – afflicted dagger moth
 Acronicta albarufa Grote, 1874
 Acronicta albistigma Hampson, 1909
 Acronicta alni Linnaeus, 1767 – alder moth
 Acronicta americana Harris, 1841 – American dagger moth
 Acronicta atristrigatus J.B. Smith, 1900 (alternative spelling Acronicta atristrigata)
 Acronicta auricoma [Schiffermüller], 1775 – scarce dagger
 Acronicta australis (Mustelin & Leuschner, 2000)
 Acronicta barnesii Smith, 1897
 Acronicta beameri Todd, 1958
 Acronicta bellula Alphéraky, 1895
 Acronicta betulae Riley, 1884 – birch dagger moth
 Acronicta bicolor Moore, 1881
 Acronicta browni Mustelin & Leuschner, 2000
 Acronicta brumosa Guenée, 1852 – charred dagger moth
 Acronicta carbonaria Graeser, 1889
 Acronicta catocaloida Graeser, 1889
 Acronicta centralis Erschoff, 1874
 Acronicta cinerea Hufnagel, 1766
 Acronicta clarescens Guenée, 1852 – clear dagger moth
 Acronicta concrepta Draudt 1937
 Acronicta connecta Grote, 1873 – connected dagger moth
 Acronicta cuspis Hübner, [1813] – large dagger
 Acronicta cyanescens Hampson, 1909
 Acronicta dahurica Kononenko & Han, 2008
 Acronicta dactylina Grote, 1874 – fingered dagger moth
 Acronicta denticulata Moore
 Acronicta digna Butler, 1881
 Acronicta dinawa Bethune-Baker, 1906
 Acronicta dolli (Barnes & McDunnough, 1918)
 Acronicta edolata Grote, 1881
 Acronicta euphorbiae [Schiffermüller], 1775 – sweet gale moth
 Acronicta exempta Dyar, 1922
 Acronicta exilis Grote, 1874 – exiled dagger moth
 Acronicta extricata Grote, 1882
 Acronicta falcula Grote, 1877
 Acronicta fragilis Guénée, 1852 – fragile dagger moth
 Acronicta funeralis Grote & Robinson, 1866 – funerary dagger moth
 Acronicta gastridia Swinhoe, 1895
 Acronicta grisea Walker, 1856 – gray dagger moth
 Acronicta hamamelis Guenée, 1852 (syn: Acronicta subochrea Grote, 1874) – witch hazel dagger moth
 Acronicta hasta Guenée, 1852 – speared dagger moth
 Acronicta hastulifera J.E. Smith, 1797 – frosted dagger moth
 Acronicta heitzmani Covell & Metzler, 1992 – Heitzman's dagger moth
 Acronicta hercules Felder & Rogenhofer, 1874
 Acronicta immodica Schmidt & Anweiler, 2020 - medium dagger moth
 Acronicta impleta Walker, 1856 – yellow-haired dagger moth
 Acronicta impressa Walker, 1856 – impressed dagger moth
 Acronicta inclara Smith, 1900 – unclear dagger moth
 Acronicta increta Morrison, 1974 – raspberry bud dagger
 Acronicta innotata Guenée, 1852 – unmarked dagger moth
 Acronicta insita Walker, 1856
 Acronicta intermedia Warren, 1909
 Acronicta interrupta Guenée, 1852 – interrupted dagger moth
 Acronicta iria Swinhoe, 1899
 Acronicta jozana Matsumura, 1926
 Acronicta laetifica Smith, 1897 – pleasant dagger moth
 Acronicta lanceolaria Grote, 1875 – lanceolate dagger moth
 Acronicta lepetita Smith, 1908
 Acronicta leporina Linnaeus, 1758 – miller
 Acronicta lepusculina Guenée, 1852 – cottonwood dagger moth
 Acronicta leucocuspis Butler, 1878
 Acronicta lithospila Grote, 1874 – streaked dagger moth
 Acronicta lobeliae Guenée, 1852 – lobelia dagger moth, greater oak dagger moth
 Acronicta longa Guenée, 1852 – long-winged dagger moth
 Acronicta lupini Grote, 1873 (syn: Acronicta ursina (Smith, 1898), Acronicta atlinensis (Barnes & Benjamin, 1927)
 Acronicta lutea Bremer & Grey 1852
 Acronicta major Bremer, 1861
 Acronicta mansueta Smith, 1897
 Acronicta marmorata Smith, 1897 – marble dagger moth
 Acronicta megacephala [Schiffermüller], 1775 – poplar grey
 Acronicta menyanthidis Esper, 1789 – light knot grass
 Acronicta metaxantha Hampson, 1909
 Acronicta modica Walker, 1856 – hesitant dagger moth
 Acronicta morula Grote & Robinson, 1868 – ochre dagger moth
 Acronicta nigricans Leech, 1900
 Acronicta noctivaga Grote, 1864 – night-wandering dagger moth
 Acronicta oblinita Smith, 1797 (syn: Acronicta arioch Strecker, 1898) – smeared dagger moth
 Acronicta omorii Matsumura, 1926
 Acronicta orientalis Mann, 1862
 Acronicta othello Smith, 1908
 Acronicta ovata Grote, 1873 – ovate dagger moth
 Acronicta parallela Grote, 1879
 Acronicta pasiphae Draudt, 1936
 Acronicta paupercula Grote, 1874
 Acronicta perblanda Ferguson, 1989
 Acronicta perdita Grote, 1874
 Acronicta pruinosa Guenée, 1852
 Acronicta psi Linnaeus, 1758 – grey dagger
 Acronicta psichinesis Kononenko & Han, 2008
 Acronicta psorallina Lower, 1903
 Acronicta pulverosa Hampson 1909
 Acronicta quadrata Smith, 1908
 Acronicta radcliffei Harvey, 1875 – Radcliffe's dagger moth
 Acronicta raphael Oberthur 1884
 Acronicta rapidan Dyar, 1912
 Acronicta retardata Walker, 1861 (syn: Acronicta caesarea Smith, 1905) – retarded dagger moth
 Acronicta rubiginosa Walker, 1862
 Acronicta rubricoma Guenée, 1852 – ruddy dagger moth
 Acronicta rumicis Linnaeus, 1758 – knot grass
 Acronicta sagittata McDunnough, 1940
 Acronicta sinescripta Ferguson, 1989
 Acronicta sperata Grote, 1873
 Acronicta spinea (Grote, 1876)
 Acronicta spinigera Guenée, 1852 – nondescript dagger moth
 Acronicta strigosa [Schiffermüller], 1775 – marsh dagger
 Acronicta strigulata Smith, 1897
 Acronicta subornata Leech, 1889
 Acronicta sugii (Kinoshita, 1990)
 Acronicta superans Guenée, 1852 – splendid dagger moth
 Acronicta theodora Schaus, 1894
 Acronicta thoracica Grote, 1880
 Acronicta tiena Püngeler, 1907
 Acronicta tota Grote, 1879
 Acronicta tridens [Schiffermüller], 1775 – dark dagger
 Acronicta tristis Smith, 1911
 Acronicta tritona Hübner, 1879 – Triton dagger moth
 Acronicta valliscola Blanchard, 1968
 Acronicta vinnula Grote, 1864 – delightful dagger moth
 Acronicta vulpina Grote, 1883 – miller dagger moth

References

External links

 
 

 
Noctuoidea genera